The 2017–18 season was Carlisle United's 113th season in their history and their fourth consecutive season in League Two. Along with League Two, the club participated in the FA Cup, EFL Cup and EFL Trophy. The season covered the period from 1 July 2017 to 30 June 2018.

Squad statistics

Competitions

Friendlies
Carlisle United announced six pre-season friendlies against Penrith, Workington, Blyth Spartans, FC Halifax Town, Blackburn Rovers and Carlisle City.

League Two

League table

Results summary

Results by matchday

Matches
On 21 June 2017, the league fixtures were announced.

FA Cup
On 16 October 2017, Carlisle United were drawn at home against Oldham Athletic in the first round. In the second round Carlisle were given an away trip to Gillingham.

EFL Cup
On 16 June 2017, Carlisle United were drawn away to Fleetwood Town in the first round. Championship side Sunderland are the second round visitors.

EFL Trophy

Transfers

Transfers in

Transfers out

Loans in

Loans out

References

Carlisle United F.C. seasons
Carlisle United